Regina Gelana Twala (1908 – 1968) was a feminist activist, writer, researcher, evangelist, and liberation leader in what is now eSwatini.

After becoming the first Black woman to graduate from the University of the Witwatersrand, Twala became a prolific researcher and political activist, helping co-found the Swaziland Progressive Party. She was also the only female candidate for a seat in Swaziland's first Legislative Council in 1964.

Biography 
Regina Twala was born in 1908, into a Zulu family.

In 1948, she became the first Black woman to obtain a degree from the University of the Witwatersrand in Johannesburg. She then pursued a graduate degree at the university, where her thesis focused on African beadwork.

She became a prolific researcher, particularly on women's issues and native customs in southern Africa. She also founded a library specifically for use by women.

As a writer, Twala contributed newspaper columns to several publications in Swaziland, including Umteteli Wa Bantu and Izwi lama Swazi. She frequently wrote under pseudonyms, including Mademoiselle, Gelana, RD Twala, Reggie, and Sister Kollie. On her death, she left behind four unpublished book manuscripts.

Twala was a pioneering African feminist and a liberation leader, active in the anti-colonial movement.

Her political activity included in 1960 co-founding the Swaziland Progressive Party, in which she was an influential figure.

She was a candidate for Swaziland's first Legislative Council in the 1964 Swazi general election, running as an independent in the Manzini constituency. Twala was the only woman to be nominated in the election. She did not win a seat.

In addition, Twala was a pioneer of Pentecostal worship in the region, an active member of the evangelical Christian movement. She is credited with introducing the Assemblies of God denomination to the area that is now eSwatini.

She married her first husband, Percy Kumalo, in 1936. In 1939, after the two divorced, she married fellow social activist Dan Twala, who became a significant collaborator in her work. The couple was close friends with Nelson Mandela and Winnie Madikizela-Mandela.

Twala died in 1968, one month before Swaziland gained independence.

A book by Joel Marie Cabrita about Twala, entitled Written Out: The Silencing of Regina Gelana Twala, was published in January 2023 by Ohio University Press and Wits University Press.

External links 

 An archive of documents relating to Regina Twala

References 

1908 births
1968 deaths
Assemblies of God people
Swazi feminists
Swazi journalists
Swazi religious leaders
Swazi women activists
Swazi women in politics
Swazi women writers
Swaziland Progressive Party politicians
University of the Witwatersrand alumni
Zulu people